Bryan M. Turner is Professor of Experimental Genetics at School of Cancer Sciences, Institute of Biomedical Research, University of Birmingham in Birmingham, UK.

He was educated at University College London, where he earned his BSc in Biochemistry (1969) and PhD in Human Biochemical Genetics (1973). Before moving to Birmingham University in 1981, he was at the National Institute for Medical Research in Mill Hill (1969–70) and the Mt Sinai School of Medicine in New York (1973–78).

He has contributed to the field of epigenetics. He was elected a Fellow of the Royal Society (FRS) in 2015, his nomination reads:

References

British geneticists
Fellows of the Royal Society
Living people
Academics of the University of Birmingham
Year of birth missing (living people)